Bingo is a 1991 American family comedy film directed by Matthew Robbins and released by TriStar Pictures.

Bingo, a runaway circus dog saves the life of Chuckie (Robert J. Steinmiller Jr.), a young boy who is somewhat an outcast within his family. The two quickly become best friends — skateboarding, playing pinball, and doing math homework together. But Chuckie's parents discover the stowaway pooch and make it clear that Bingo will not accompany them on their cross-country move.

Plot 

Bingo is an outcast circus dog whose owners, Steve (Simon Webb) and his wife, Ginger (Suzie Plakson), pay little attention to. Their star puppy, Lauren, develops an infection from having stepped on a nail, so they use Bingo in place of her for their next act, The Ring of Fire. Bingo is afraid of fire, having lost his mother to a fire as a puppy, and chickens out. Enraged by the embarrassment, Steve gets ready to shoot him, but Ginger stops him and while trying to restrain him, tells Bingo to start over and find a family. Bingo does so when Ginger finally agrees with Steve to kill him when Bingo mistakes her orders several times.

The next day, 12-year-old Chuckie (Robert J. Steinmiller Jr.) and his 14-year-old brother, Chickie (David French) along with friends of his go for a bike ride but Chuckie is too slow. To prove to the group that he is not scared, he attempts to jump a bridge (with sunglasses), but based on lack of skills, nearly kills himself in the process. Bingo sees the whole thing and jumps on Chuckie's stomach to get the water out of him. After recovering and going to bed, Chuckie wakes up to find that his dirty clothes have been hung up on the washing line (including Bingo's collar). He eventually finds Bingo and thanks him for saving his life, and they will be friends for life. Bingo finds a fish for Chuckie to eat but encounters a bear in the process, which Bingo manages to drive off.

Meanwhile, Chuckie's parents Natalie and Hal (Cindy Williams and David Rasche), the latter being the placekicker for the Denver Broncos, worry over their son. But the next morning, when Chuckie returns, they do not want to know where he was, instead telling him to take a shower as he smells like "wet dog". Chuckie has to leave for school. After that, both the boy and dog spend more time together (skateboarding, reading magazines, playing video games, and doing math homework). Feeling ignored and even emotionally hurt by his parents and older brother, who seems to care more about his father's NFL career, he considers Bingo to be a godsend, but Bingo causes trouble as well (getting into Natalie's cold cream, chewing Chickie's citizenship award, and soiling the driveway in which Hal had slipped).

Chuckie returns home and his best friend is largely blamed for the incidents. Hal tells him to go upstairs and start packing as he has been traded to another team, the Green Bay Packers. Chuckie makes a death-proof box for Bingo to sleep in so he can take him with him. Bingo sneaks out in the middle of the night and goes to see the next-door's dog, whom he met earlier, with flowers and a bottle of champagne. The next morning, he misses Chuckie's car as it drives off on the journey to their new home. Chasing the car, Chuckie's parents spot him, and they drive away.

Bingo then gets into an encounter with a policeman, who believes he has been drinking and fines him. After escaping, Bingo passes out from dehydration and is taken in by a man, who actually kills dogs and cooks them. Bingo advises the rest of the captured dogs to dig under the cells and then attack him. Then he drives a truck (with the man and his wife in a cell) and jumps out as they crash.

As Chuckie and his family are staying at a motel, Bingo is around somewhere sniffing garbage. There, he is taken in by two criminals, Lenny and Eli (Kurt Fuller and Joe Guzaldo). He sees that they have taken a family hostage. Bingo realizes they could be killed, so he telephones 911 and frees the family. The next day, the authorities arrive to arrest the kidnappers. In gratitude, the family takes him in and the girls argue over what to call their new pet until a man comes in to take Bingo to court. After an unfair trial, Bingo is jailed for contempt of court.

Bingo ends up in a cell with a man known as "Four-Eyes" (Wayne Robson), who befriends him and saves him from a knife incident (involving Lenny and Eli) in the laundry room. That night, they escape together, but Four-Eyes is not so lucky (he is shot non-fatally by a nightwatchman). Then Bingo walks for a long time and stops for a rest at a kind young woman (Tamsin Kelsey), Bunny's house. She gives him some travel supplies and he walks again. He then finds Chuckie but sees that he is walking another dog, so he mistakenly thinks he does not care about him anymore. Homeless and alone, he finds work in a friendly cook's restaurant.

Lenny and Eli are informed of Bingo's escape and set out to kill him, but when they have him cornered, Chuckie spots them and races his bike toward the criminals, only to get held at ransom. After an altercation over the phone with Natalie, Eli tells her they have Chuckie and that they want Hal to miss all his field goals for that day's game. Natalie and Chickie repeatedly answer the door to Bingo, who holds a number of Chuckie's clothes. When he brings home enough of them to confirm evidence, Natalie suddenly becomes worried, and Chickie agrees to go out and try and spot where Chuckie is held hostage, in which he succeeds.

Natalie phones Hal at the stadium and tells him about how Lenny and Eli have Chuckie and are holding him captive. When said that they will pay any amount, Natalie informs him that it is not like that and that Hal needs to miss all his field goals or risk Chuckie being killed. After the phone call, Hal asks if he could have a word with his coach (Howard Storey); he asks him "What's more important, family or football?" to which the coach responds that football is his life.

Chickie runs into the room and tells Natalie that he has found Chuckie and that they have no choice but to call the police. Meanwhile, Eli and Lenny are attacked by Bingo, and is captured and tied up with Chuckie. Carelessly, Eli tosses his cigarette, setting the lair on fire just as they break for the car. Chuckie, seemingly dying of the heat and smoke inhalation, tells Bingo to ring the fire alarm. Bingo does so, overcoming his fear of fire. The police move in and listen to the game on the radio. Then they arrest Lenny and Eli and nurse Chuckie's injuries. They call the bomb squad to find a bomb that was hidden in one of the suitcases. After finding out that Chuckie is safe, Hal scores a last-minute, crucial field goal, but at the same time Bingo is holding the suitcase containing the bomb and it explodes. Natalie screams and faints, and so does Chuckie. The fireman then makes a call and finds a piece of fur in mid-air.

When Chuckie wakes up, he is in the hospital with Natalie, Hal and Chickie. Hal tells him they found Bingo so they go to see him in his room. Once they enter his room, they find a crowd of people (including the dogs that were tortured). They are all the people whom Bingo met on his journey, and Natalie tells Chuckie that they are Bingo's friends and they have been at the hospital all night, since they all heard his story on the news and wanted to wish him well. Chuckie pulls the curtain to reveal Bingo with a bandaged leg, and lying down in bed. Chuckie tells him he needs him and he must pull through, and the doctor muses that he will be fine. Then Chuckie asks Hal if he can keep Bingo, and after some encouragement from everybody, he gives in and says "Sure, son. Just as soon as we have him neutered." The film ends with a circle around Bingo's head giving an upset look as the credits roll.

Cast

Lacey as Bingo
Cindy Williams as Natalie Devlin
David Rasche as Hal Devlin
Robert J. Steinmiller Jr. as Chuckie Devlin
David French as Chickie Devlin
Kurt Fuller as Lenny, a thug.
Joe Guzaldo as Eli, a thug.
Robert Thurston as Mr. Thompson
Sheelah Megill as Mrs. Thompson
Chelan Simmons as Cindy Thompson
Kimberley Warnat as Sandy Thompson
Glenn Shadix as Duke, a restaurant owner and butcher who uses dogs to make franks.
Janet Wright as Emma Lois, the wife of Duke who is a waitress of his restaurant.
Wayne Robson as Four Eyes, a prisoner who cellmates Bingo.
Suzie Plakson as Ginger, a Circus performer and wife of Steve who along with him is the first owners of Bingo.
Simon Webb as Steve, a Circus performer who is the first owner of Bingo.

Tamsin Kelsey as Bunny, a prostitute who helps Bingo out.
Betty Linde as Mrs. Wallaby, an elderly neighbor of the Devlins in Green Bay.
James Kidnie as Defense Attorney
Norman Browning as Prosecutor
Blu Mankuma as Motorcycle Cop
Jackson Davies as Vet
Antony Holland as Circus vet
Bill Meilen as Vic, a restaurant owner and its head cook.
Stephen E. Miller as Sheriff Clay
Drum Garrett as Dishwasher
Howard Storey as Coach
Denalda Williams as Doctor's assistant
Gloria Macarenko as Reporter
Sylvia Mitchell as Court reporter
Frank Welker as Special vocal effects

Reception
The Washington Times gave Bingo a half-star out of four, and deemed it "The Problem Child of pet pooch movies."

See also
List of American films of 1991

References

External links
 
 
 

1991 films
1991 comedy-drama films
1990s children's comedy films
American fantasy comedy films
American children's comedy films
American children's films
American prison comedy films
American road movies
1990s English-language films
Denver Broncos
Films about dogs
Films about hostage takings
Films about pets
TriStar Pictures films
Films directed by Matthew Robbins
Films scored by Richard Gibbs
1990s American films